Aliabad (also Romanized as ‘Alīābād; also known as Mehdīābād) is a village in Rud Ab-e Gharbi Rural District, Rud Ab District, Narmashir County, Kerman Province, Iran. As of the 2006 census, its population was 67, in 16 families.

References 

Populated places in Narmashir County